Sean Andrew Heather (born 5 February 1982, in Chichester, West Sussex, England) is an English cricketer. He is a right-handed Batsman and a right-arm medium-pace bowler.

The former Eastbourne cricketer holds the record throughout 2005 for the most runs in a Premier Division season with 1082 runs.

External links

1982 births
Living people
English cricketers
Sussex cricketers
Sportspeople from Chichester
21st-century English people